The 2021 Austrian Grand Prix (officially known as the Formula 1 BWT  Großer Preis von Österreich 2021) was a Formula One motor race held on 4 July 2021 at the Red Bull Ring in Spielberg, Austria. The race was the ninth round of the 2021 Formula One World Championship, and the 35th running of the Austrian Grand Prix (the 34th as part of the World Championship since 1950) as well as the second of two consecutive races to be held at the Red Bull Ring with the Styrian Grand Prix held the week before at the same venue.

Background 

The drivers and teams were the same as the season entry list with no additional stand-in drivers for the race. Callum Ilott drove for Alfa Romeo Racing in place of Antonio Giovinazzi in the first free practice session, as well as Roy Nissany, who drove for Williams in place of George Russell, and Guanyu Zhou, who drove for Alpine in place of Fernando Alonso, making his Formula One practice debut.

Tyre supplier Pirelli brought the C3, C4, and C5 tyre compounds (designated hard, medium, and soft, respectively)  for teams to use at the event. Initially, Pirelli selected C2, C3, and C4 tyre compounds before changing the tyre choices in accordance with the double event at the same venue, preceded the week before by the Styrian Grand Prix.

Qualifying 
Red Bull driver Max Verstappen set the fastest time in qualifying to take the seventh pole position of his career. He was followed by Lando Norris who qualified a career-best second and McLaren's best since , and Verstappen's teammate Sergio Pérez in third place.

Qualifying classification

Notes 
  – Sebastian Vettel received a three-place grid penalty for impeding Fernando Alonso during qualifying.

Race 

The race started at 15:00 local time. Esteban Ocon retired on the first lap after colliding with the Alfa Romeo of Antonio Giovinazzi and breaking his front suspension. The safety car was deployed and the race was continued on lap 4. At the restart, Lando Norris, who was running 2nd at the time, tried to defend against the Red Bull of Sergio Pérez at turn 4, which resulted in Perez going off-track and joining back in tenth place. Norris was given a 5-second time penalty for the incident. On lap 31, Norris pitted to serve his penalty and to change his tyres. Perez received two 5-second penalties, having been judged to have "forced Leclerc off track" on two occasions. On the last lap, Kimi Räikkönen collided with the Aston Martin of Sebastian Vettel, meaning Vettel was unable to finish the race. By taking pole, fastest lap, win, and leading every lap of the race, Max Verstappen achieved his first career grand slam.

Race classification

Notes 
  – Includes one point for fastest lap.
  – Sergio Pérez received a 10-second time penalty for forcing Charles Leclerc out of the track twice.
  – Yuki Tsunoda received a five-second time penalty for crossing the line at the pit entry.
  – Lance Stroll received a five-second time penalty for speeding in the pit lane.
  – Kimi Räikkönen finished 16th on track, but received a post-race drive-through penalty converted to a 20-second time penalty for causing a collision with Sebastian Vettel. He was classified 15th due to Nicholas Latifi's penalty.
  – Nicholas Latifi finished 15th on track, but received a post-race 10-second stop-and-go time penalty converted to a 30-second time penalty for not respecting double yellow flags.
  – Sebastian Vettel was classified as he completed more than 90% of the race distance.
  – Nikita Mazepin received a post-race 10-second stop-and-go time penalty converted to a 30-second time penalty for not respecting double yellow flags. This made no difference as he finished last.

Championship standings after the race

Drivers' Championship standings

Constructors' Championship standings

 Note: Only the top five positions are included for both sets of standings.

See also 
 2021 Spielberg Formula 3 round
 2021 W Series Spielberg round 2

Notes

References

External links

Austrian Grand Prix
Austrian
Austrian Grand Prix
Austrian Grand Prix